Frederick Ayres (born 17 March 1876; died 23 Nov 1926) was an American composer.  Born in Binghamton, New York, he studied at Cornell University;  further study, this time in music, came with Edgar Stillman Kelley and Arthur Foote.  Ayres lived in Colorado Springs, Colorado for many years, during which time he became a "musical spokesman" for the Rocky Mountain area; he died there in 1926.  Among his compositions were an overture, From the Plains; a string quartet and some other pieces of chamber music, and some songs.

References

Further reading

External links
 

American male composers
American classical composers
Cornell University alumni
1876 births
1926 deaths
People from Binghamton, New York
Musicians from Colorado Springs, Colorado
Classical musicians from New York (state)